Begonia sizemoreae is a species of flowering plant in the family Begoniaceae, native to Laos and Vietnam. It is popular in cultivation.

References

sizemoreae
Flora of Laos
Flora of Vietnam
Plants described in 2004